Petra Ecclestone (born 19 December 1988) is a British heiress, model, fashion designer and socialite.

Early life
Ecclestone was born in London as the younger daughter of former Armani model Slavica Radić and English Formula One billionaire Bernie Ecclestone. She has an older sister, Tamara Jane, an older paternal half-sister, Deborah, and a younger paternal half-brother, Alexander.

She attended Trevor-Roberts School, then Francis Holland School, and Benenden School.

She contracted viral meningitis at the age of 14, and told the media that it "changed her life forever". She said "I no longer take my health for granted ... I'm now a health freak and a hypochondriac. I'm obsessed with cleanliness, I eat healthily and take my vitamins." She has since become an ambassador for the Meningitis Trust.

Fashion career
Growing up, she wanted to be a fashion designer. She decided to make menswear because it is a "bigger niche" and because "womenswear was too saturated".

At the age of 19, she created the menswear label FORM, which was sold into retailers including Harrods from October 2008. In April 2009, it was announced that Petra had signed a contract with the Croatian clothing manufacturer Siscia.

Personal life

As well as English, she speaks Croatian fluently and understands French and Italian.

On 27 August 2011, Ecclestone married businessman James Stunt. She gave birth to their first child, a daughter, in February 2013. In April 2015 she gave birth to twin boys. Their divorce was finalised on 12 October 2017, along with an agreed split of their estimated £5.5 billion joint wealth, and she reverted to her maiden name. In 2020 she gave birth to her second daughter. On 16 July 2022, Ecclestone married businessman Sam Palmer.

Residences
Her  mansion, The Manor, was the former residence of Candy and Aaron Spelling, and was the largest house in Los Angeles County. According to a 2012 article in The Wall Street Journal, she had first viewed several other properties, including a 36,000-square-foot property on Sunset Boulevard, priced at $49.5 million. The real estate broker Rick Hilton said: "I showed her several properties but they weren't grand enough." In 2014, Ecclestone put The Manor back on the market with a price tag of $150 million. However, she reportedly turned down an offer that met her price in December 2015. The Manor was relisted for sale in October 2016 with an asking price of $200 million. In June 2019, it sold to an anonymous buyer for $119.7 million, the highest sale price in Californian history.  

She also owns a residence in Chelsea, London, that she bought in 2010 for $90 million. The owner of the construction company that worked on the building, Sayed Bukhari, said in The Wall Street Journal article that she had already been offered more than $125 million for the four-storey home.

See also 
 List of largest houses in the Los Angeles Metropolitan Area
 List of largest houses in the United States

References

English socialites
Petra
1988 births
Living people
Businesspeople from London
English fashion designers
British women fashion designers
English people of Serbian descent
English people of Bosnia and Herzegovina descent
English people of Croatian descent
People educated at Francis Holland School
People from Westminster
People from Holmby Hills, Los Angeles